Soedesco (stylized in all caps) is a video game publisher of both digital and physical games on multiple platforms. The company has been active in the game industry since 2002 and ventured into publishing in 2014, with the headquarters in Rotterdam, Netherlands. Soedesco's portfolio consists of a wide range of genres and includes titles such as Monstrum, Owlboy, Among the Sleep, Monster Crown, Teslagrad and Remothered: Tormented Fathers. The company has also published its own IPs including Truck Driver®, Adam's Venture®, and Real Farm. Soedesco consists of four different divisions: Communications, Creative, Producing and Development.

In 2017, Soedesco partnered with 1C Company to release physical indie game titles.

In July 2019, the company opened another game development studio in  Pilsen, Czech Republic, their first outside of the Netherlands. Between the two locations, Soedesco continues to focus on creating its own games for multiple platforms.

Games published

References

External links

Privately held companies of the Netherlands
Video game companies of the Netherlands
Video game development companies
Video game publishers
Video game companies established in 2002
Dutch companies established in 2002
Companies based in Rotterdam